Crosswinds is the second album of fusion drummer Billy Cobham. The album was released in 1974 and it contains four songs in total, all composed by Billy Cobham. It features songs that are more mid-tempo and slow-tempo as opposed to the earlier  Spectrum album.

Cover art
A photo taken by Billy Cobham himself is used for the cover art; it wraps around the spine to comprise both the front and back cover.

Track listing
All selections written by Billy Cobham.

Side one
 "Spanish Moss – 'A Sound Portrait'" – 17:08
a. "Spanish Moss" – 4:08
b. "Savannah The Serene" – 5:09
Solos: Garnett Brown & George Duke
c. "Storm" – 2:46
Solo: Billy Cobham
d. "Flash Flood" – 5:05
Solos: Randy Brecker & John Abercrombie

Side two
 "The Pleasant Pheasant" – 5:11
Solos: Lee Pastora, Michael Brecker, George Duke & Billy Cobham
 "Heather" – 8:25
Solos: George Duke & Michael Brecker
 "Crosswind" – 3:39
Solo: John Abercrombie

Personnel
 John Abercrombie – guitars
 Michael Brecker – woodwinds
 Randy Brecker – trumpet
 Garnett Brown – trombone
 Billy Cobham – drums, percussion, production, orchestrations
 George Duke – keyboards
 Lee Pastora – latin percussion
 Ken Scott – production, recording and re-mix engineering
 John Williams – acoustic & electric basses

Chart performance

Trivia
The song "Heather" was used as the basis for the Souls of Mischief song "93 'til Infinity".

References

External links
 

1974 albums
Albums produced by Ken Scott
Albums recorded at Electric Lady Studios
Atlantic Records albums
Billy Cobham albums